Lakshmibai Tilak (1868–1936) was a Marathi writer from Maharashtra, India.

Life
According to the social custom of her times, she was married off by her parents at her age 11 to Narayan Waman Tilak.

Narayan Waman Tilak was an accomplished Marathi poet. He gave Laxmibai basic formal education to the extent that she could read and write basic marathi. When he converted to Christianity, she at first was shocked. Gradually, however, she overcame her distaste, and eventually became a Christian herself. She tells this story with great simplicity in absolutely Step by Step. With his encouragement, despite her limited formal education, Lakshmibai too composed some superb poetry. Further, she wrote her autobiography under the title Smritichitre (स्मृतिचित्रे), which turned out to be a masterpiece in Marathi literature.  The autobiography was published in four parts during 1934 -1937. In 1950, E. Josephine Inkster translated it into English under the title I Follow After.

Narayan Waman Tilak started to compose in Marathi an epic titled "Khristayana" (क्रिस्तायन) describing the works of Jesus Christ. However, he died after finishing ten of its chapters. Lakshmibai completed the epic by adding to it 64 chapters of her own.

Bibliography

Primary
Tilak, Laksmibai. Smrtichitren. Serialized in the weekly Sanjivani.
Tilak, Laksmibai. Smrtichitren, Part 1. 15 December 1934.
Tilak, Laksmibai. Smrtichitren, Part 2. 1935.
Tilak, Laksmibai. Smrtichitren, Part 3, 1936.
Tilak, Laksmibai. Smrtichitren, Part 4. 15 December 1935. [or 1937?] 7 impressions up to 1953.
Tilak, Laksmibai. Smrtichitren. Abridged version, ed. K.B. Devale. Mumbai, 1940.
Tilak, Laksmibai. I Follow After. English tr. of Part 1 by E. Josephine Inkster. London / Madras: Oxford University Press, 1950. 353 pp.
Tilak, Laksmibai. Smrtichitren. Abridged version, Sahitya Akademi, Mumbai, 1958, 1968.
Tilak, Laksmibai. Sampurna Smrtichitren. Parts 1-4. Abhinava avrtti, ed. Ashok D. Tilak. 1st ed. 1973.
Tilak, Laksmibai. Smrtichitren. Abridged version, ed. H.A. Bhave, Varda Prakashan, Pune, 1987. Second impression / edition 1989.
Tilak, Laksmibai. Sampurna Smrtichitren. Parts 1-4. Abhinava avrtti, ed. Ashok D. Tilak. 2nd ed. 1989.
Tilak, Laksmibai and Devadatta Tilak. Sampurna Smritichitren. Ed. Ashok Devadatta Tilak. 3rd revised ed. Mumbai: Popular Prakashan, 1996. Containing all 4 parts, plus other scholarly apparatus (introduction, notes, index).
Tilak, Laksmibai. I follow after: An Autobiography. Delhi: OUP, 1998.
Tilak, Laksmibai. (Sanksipta) Smrtichitren. Ed. Devadatta Narayan Tilak. Mumbai: Popular Prakashan, 2000. (1st ed. 1958, 4th ed. 1996).
Tilak, Laksmibai. Bharali Ghagar. Ed. K.B. Devale. Mumbai, 1948.
Tilak, Laksmibai. 'Agadi Step by Step.’ Testimony of Lakshmibai Tilak in her own words. Ed. Ashok Devdatt Tilak. Nashik: Mayawati A. Tilak, Shantisadan, 1968.

Secondary
George, Anthony D. Svatantryapurvakalatila Dharmantarita Khristi Vyaktinci Atmanivedane Samajika Ani Vangmayina Abhyasa. Mumbai: Mumbai Vidyapeeth, 2007. [PhD. submitted to Bombay University on Marathi converts to Christianity of the Pre-Independence (1947) era.]

References

Marathi-language writers
Indian Christians
Converts to Christianity
1868 births
1936 deaths
Indian Christian writers
Women writers from Maharashtra
19th-century Indian women writers
19th-century Indian writers
20th-century Indian women writers
20th-century Indian writers
Women autobiographers
Indian autobiographers
Indian women non-fiction writers